Park Jeong-a (born 20 April 1963) is a South Korean sports shooter. She competed in the women's 10 metre air rifle event at the 1984 Summer Olympics.

References

1963 births
Living people
South Korean female sport shooters
Olympic shooters of South Korea
Shooters at the 1984 Summer Olympics
Place of birth missing (living people)
Shooters at the 1986 Asian Games
Asian Games medalists in shooting
Asian Games gold medalists for South Korea
Medalists at the 1986 Asian Games
20th-century South Korean women
21st-century South Korean women